David Mullen may refer to:
David Robert Mullen (born 1952), artist and photographer
David Mullen (singer) (born 1964), Christian singer and producer
M. David Mullen (born 1962), cinematographer
David B. Mullen (1885–1940), member of the Legislative Assembly of Alberta